Dassler is the surname of:

 Adolf Dassler (1900–1978), German cobbler and founder of German sportswear company Adidas
 Armin Dassler (1929–1990), CEO of sportswear company Puma and son of Rudolf Dassler
 Britta Katharina Dassler (born 1964), German politician 
 Horst Dassler (1936–1987), chairman of sportswear company Adidas and son of Adolf Dassler
 Jonas Dassler (born 1996), German stage and film actor
 Rudolf Dassler (1898–1974), founder of German sportswear company Puma and brother of Adolf Dassler
 Stefan Dassler (born 1962), German author of non-fiction books
 Uwe Dassler (born 1967, Uwe Daßler in German), German free-style swimmer

See also
 Dessler, a surname

German-language surnames